Armadillo de los Infante is a town and municipality in San Luis Potosí in central Mexico.

The name of the town is in honor of the Infante family, owners of the first printing company there, in the early nineteenth century. It is located at the center of the state and approximately 61 kilometers from the city of San Luis Potosí.

The municipality is semi-warm climate with warm summer rains. The average annual temperature is 18 °C, with a maximum of 27 °C and minimum of 1 °C. The rain is normal between the months of May and August, with an average of 304.7 mm.

Places of interest: Church of the Immaculate Conception, Printing house, Ex Hacienda Pozo del Carmen, Dam Sweet Vara.

References

Municipalities of San Luis Potosí